The 1932–33 Bradford City A.F.C. season was the 26th in the club's history.

The club finished 11th in Division Two, and reached the 3rd round of the FA Cup.

Sources

References

Bradford City A.F.C. seasons
Bradford City